What Bumosaur Is That? is a children's encyclopedia written by Andy Griffiths in 2007 as a companion to Bumageddon, describing many of the fictional prehistoric species mentioned in Bumageddon: The Final Pongflict. In 2010, a new edition was released as A & T's Wonderful World of Stupidity-Vol 1. 

2007 children's books
Australian children's books
Pan Books books